Friedrich Johann Karl Becke (31 December 1855, in Prague – 18 June 1931, in Vienna) was an Austrian mineralogist and petrographer.

Biography 
After studying at the University of Vienna, where he specialized in the natural sciences, he became there a lecturer on geology. In 1882 he was appointed professor at the University of Czernowitz. Eight years later he received a similar appointment at Prague, but soon after went to Vienna, where he became professor of mineralogy, succeeding Gustav Tschermak von Seysenegg as such, of whose periodical Mineralogische und Petrographische Mittheilungen he became editor. He published many papers on the science of geology and mineralogy, but he was best known on account of his researches in the field of rock-forming minerals and how they may be determined by means of their light-refractive properties. The results of these studies were published by the Vienna Academy (1893).

His doctoral students include Adelheid Kofler.

References

Further reading 
 Friedrichbeckeite
 
 Becke Friedrich. In: Österreichisches Biographisches Lexikon 1815–1950 (ÖBL). Band 1, Verlag der Österreichischen Akademie der Wissenschaften, Wien 1957, S. 62. 
 Friedrich Becke 
 Honors 
 10 Jahre Arbeitsgruppe Geschichte der Erdwissenschaften Österreichs 
 Das wissenschaftliche Erbe von Gustav Tschermak-Seysenegg (1836–1927): Eine Zusammenstellung biographischer Daten seiner Doktoranden 
 Friedrich Becke und die Tauerngeologie 

1855 births
1931 deaths
19th-century Austrian scientists
20th-century Austrian scientists
Austrian mineralogists
University of Vienna alumni
Academic staff of the University of Vienna
Academic staff of Chernivtsi University
Corresponding members of the Saint Petersburg Academy of Sciences
Corresponding Members of the Russian Academy of Sciences (1917–1925)
Corresponding Members of the USSR Academy of Sciences
German Bohemian people
Austrian people of German Bohemian descent
Scientists from Prague
Petrologists
Members of the Göttingen Academy of Sciences and Humanities